Devtal (Nepali: देवताल ) is a rural municipality in Bara District in Province No. 2 of Nepal. It was formed in 2016 occupying current 7 sections (wards) from previous 7 former VDCs. It occupies an area of 23.31 km2 with a total population of 23,223.

References 

Populated places in Bara District
Rural municipalities of Nepal established in 2017
Rural municipalities in Madhesh Province